Hillel Fuld is an American Israeli technology business advisor, blogger, and vlogger. Fuld's work focuses on the Israeli high tech industry, guidance for startup companies, and marketing tips for growing a business or personal brands.

Fuld has been recognized as one of the most influential people in the Israeli tech industry, and has been ranked in the top ten of global technology bloggers.

Family and education
Hillel Fuld was born in New York City to an Orthodox Jewish family, where his father, Rabbi Yonah Fuld, served as principal of Salanter Akiba Riverdale Academy. As a teenager, Fuld moved with his family from the United States to  Jerusalem, Israel. Fuld graduated with a BA in political science from Bar Ilan University in Tel Aviv. He has spent his career in Israel's high tech industry. Fuld currently resides in Israel with his wife and their five children. In addition to his role as a technology advisor, Fuld also writes a weekly column for The Jerusalem Post, Inc. magazine, and runs a YouTube vlog.

Fuld's older brother, Ari Fuld, was stabbed in the back and killed by a Palestinian terrorist in September 2018 at the Gush Etzion Junction. Although he had just been stabbed, Ari Fuld, a trained Israel Defense Forces soldier and reservist, neutralized the terrorist on-site, preventing others from being injured. Fuld has described his brother as a hero and has memorialized him publicly at speaking engagements across the world. Ari Fuld was posthumously awarded with a medal by the Israeli Police in November 2018. Fuld was one of 54 to receive honors that evening at an event attended by members of the Knesset, police commissioner Roni Alsheikh and the president of Israel Reuven Rivlin

Early career
Fuld began blogging while he was working at Comverse Technology, a now defunct telecommunications company, as a technical writer. His blog, Tech N' Marketing, gained traction and followers, especially after a post where he challenged conventional wisdom in the tech pundit world by predicting that the Microsoft Windows phone would be a success. Although the prediction was ultimately incorrect, Fuld's blog became a resource for both investors and entrepreneurs alike and Fuld himself established credibility as an authority on the technology industry. Fuld blogged about what he considered to be exciting companies and gave tips for success.

The blog attracted the attention of journalists and investors because they wanted to know who to be paying attention to, and entrepreneurs because they wanted to break into Fuld's network and get publicity from his platform. Eventually, Fuld established a model where startups would have him join their companies in an official capacity as an advisor in exchange for equity in the business.

Through his blog, Fuld has conducted interviews with influencers and public figures including Marc Andreessen, Gary Vaynerchuk, Guy Kawasaki, Alyssa Milano, and Steve Wozniak.

YouTube Vlog
Fuld started his YouTube vlog in 2017 and has since aired more than 400 episodes and has over 2,000 subscribers. Each episode contains commentary and footage from Fuld's daily meetings. While Fuld's niche has traditionally been the world of technology, the subject matters for his vlog interviews come from a wide range of industries. The vlog has featured former NBA player Omri Casspi, Hassidic singer Shulem Lemmer and several technology executives. Additionally, Fuld has interviewed Daniel B. Shapiro and David M. Friedman, each of whom served as the United States ambassador to Israel for the Obama and Trump administrations, respectively. Sponsors for his vlog have included, among others, B&H Photo with whom Fuld has a partnership. Hillel Fuld promotes technology gear that he uses for vlogging on the B&H website.

Business
Outside of working with entrepreneurs, Fuld collaborates with many global technology companies in an advisor capacity. He is a certified Google Developer Expert, a Huawei Key Opinion Leader and on Oracle Corporation's startup advisory board. Fuld served as a spokesperson for El Al Israel Airlines Start Up Nation campaign and is a brand ambassador for several technology companies that were either founded in Israel or by Israelis including Powtoon, Hometalk, Intelligo, ZUtA Labs, and Umoove.

In 2014, Fuld founded and was chief marketing officer of Zula, a collaborative software platform that was built to unify team communication. The company raised venture capital funding from investors such as Microsoft's M12, OurCrowd, Kima Ventures, and others. In 2016, Zula became ZCast and pivoted their company mission to eliminating the barrier of entry into podcasting and allowing any user to launch a podcast. ZCast shut down and was removed from the Apple App Store in 2019.

In 2018, he was the keynote speaker at the Touro College Division of Graduate Studies commencement in New York City.

References

External links 
 

Israeli business executives
Israeli Jews
American emigrants to Israel
American Jews
Living people
Year of birth missing (living people)
Technology evangelism
Israeli bloggers
Video bloggers
American bloggers
Israeli businesspeople
YouTube vloggers
Businesspeople in software
Bar-Ilan University alumni